{{DISPLAYTITLE:C9H16O}}
The molecular formula C9H16O (molar mass: 140.22 g/mol) may refer to:

 Cyclohexylacetone
 Nonenals
 2-Nonenal
 3-Nonenal
 4-Nonenal
 5-Nonenal
 6-Nonenal
 7-Nonenal
 8-Nonenal